Dusty Mitchell Ryan (born September 2, 1984) is an American former professional baseball player. A catcher, Ryan played in Major League Baseball for the Detroit Tigers.

Ryan's first major league hit was a home run. He is 6'4" tall and weighs 220 pounds.

On December 21, 2009, Ryan was traded from the Detroit Tigers to the San Diego Padres for a player to be named later or cash considerations.

Ryan was called up to the Padres on May 31, . On November 6, 2010 Ryan signed a minor league deal with the New York Mets with an invitation to Major League spring training.

In May 2012, Ryan was working as a laborer for facilities management at the University of California, Merced campus.

Dusty works as a heavy equipment operator for Merced Irrigation District.

References

External links

1984 births
Living people
Baseball players from California
Major League Baseball catchers
Oneonta Tigers players
West Michigan Whitecaps players
Gulf Coast Tigers players
Lakeland Tigers players
Erie SeaWolves players
Toledo Mud Hens players
Detroit Tigers players
Merced Blue Devils baseball players
Buffalo Bisons (minor league) players
Binghamton Mets players
People from Merced, California